HMS Diligence was a 10-gun Alderney-class sloop of the Royal Navy which saw active service during the Seven Years' War and the American Revolutionary War. Launched in 1756, she was a successful privateer hunter off the coast of France before being reassigned to North American waters in 1763. Fifteen years later she was briefly refitted as a receiving ship for press ganged sailors brought into Sheerness Dockyard, before being re-registered in August 1779 as the fireship Comet.

In December 1780 she was sold into private hands at Sheerness Dockyard for £300.

Construction
This was Bately's first experience with vessel design, for which he substantially borrowed from the shape and dimensions of George IIs yacht HMY Royal Caroline, built in 1750 by Master Shipwright John Hollond. Bately then added to Hollond's hull design by lengthening the "fore-rake" – the area of the bow that extended beyond the keel – in order to improve the sloop's stability in heavy swell.

Admiralty Orders of 14 November 1755 indicated that the Alderney-class vessels were to be built at private dockyards, leaving the Royal Dockyards fully engaged in constructing or fitting-out the larger ships of the line. For previous Navy contracts the prices quoted by Thames River shipyards had proved exorbitant, and the Navy Board had evidence that the shipwrights were colluding to fix higher rates for construction work. In consequence only regional shipwrights were invited to bid for Diligence, with the contract awarded on 27 February 1756 to William Wells and Company, a private shipyard in Deptford. Contract terms stipulated that the vessel be completed within six months.

The new vessel's keel was laid in March 1756 and work commenced on the hull. As fitted out for Royal Navy service she was lightly armed with 10 four-pounder cannons ranged along her upper deck, accompanied by 12 -pounder swivel guns for anti-personnel use.

The half-built sloop was formally christened Diligence on 25 May 1756 and was launched in July 1756, well within the contracted deadline of six months. After launch, she was sailed to Deptford Dockyard for fitting out and to take on guns and crew.

Service
American Revolutionary War: On 6 April 1778, she was credited, along with HMS Antilope, for capturing American schooner "John".

References

Bibliography
 
 

Sloops of the Royal Navy
1756 ships